Nicholas "Nic" Hum (born 29 January 1993) is an Australian Paralympic athlete with an intellectual disability. He won the bronze medal in the men's long jump T20 event at the 2020 Summer Paralympics held in Tokyo, Japan.

Personal
Hum was born on 29 January 1993 and has an intellectual disability. He works as a carpenter/builder. His father represented Victoria in athletics.
He studied in Dandenong Emerson, graduated in 2011.

Athletics
Hum started athletics in 2010 and is a member of the Glenhuntly Athletic Club in Melbourne, Victoria. He is classified as a T20. His main event is the T20 Long Jump. In November 2010, he won the long jump and the 100m at the Australian AWD Junior Championships in Canberra, breaking the national records in both events. Hum has competed at four IPC World Championships.  At the 2011 IPC Athletics World Championships, he finished 5th in the Men's Long Jump F20 with a jump of 6.55m (-0.4) . This set an Australian and Oceania record. At the 2013 IPC Athletics World Championships, he finished 8th in the Men's Long Jump T20 with a jump of  6.19m(+1.0). At the 2015 IPC Athletics World Championships, he finished 10th in the Men's Long Jump T20 with a jump of 6.31m(+2.0).

At the 2016 Rio Paralympics, he finished fifth in the Men's Long Jump T20 with a jump of 	6.89.

At the 2017 World Para Athletics Championships in London, England, he finished fifth in the Men's Long Jump T20 with a jump of f 6.78m (-0.1).

He competed at the 2020 Summer Paralympics, where he won the bronze medal in the Men's Long Jump T20 with an Australian record 7.12m.  

In 2021, he is coached by John Boas.

Hum's other sporting passion is basketball and he represented Australia at Global Games, Italy 2011.

References

External links
 
 
 Nicholas Hum at Australian Athletics Historical Results

Paralympic athletes of Australia
Athletes (track and field) at the 2016 Summer Paralympics
Athletes (track and field) at the 2020 Summer Paralympics
Living people
Intellectual Disability category Paralympic competitors
1993 births
Competitors in athletics with intellectual disability
Paralympic bronze medalists for Australia
Paralympic medalists in athletics (track and field)
Australian male long jumpers
Athletes from Melbourne
Sportsmen from Victoria (Australia)
People from the City of Frankston